You Are My World is the tenth album in the live praise and worship series of contemporary worship music by Hillsong Church. The album reached the ARIA Albums Chart Top 100.

Making of the album
You Are My World was recorded live at the Sydney Entertainment Centre by Darlene Zschech and the Hillsong team, with over 300 singers and musicians. This was the first live praise and worship album Hillsong Church recorded in the Sydney Entertainment Centre. Over 9,000 people from the newly merged Hillsong Church congregation in both the Hills and City came together to record the album.

Track listing (CD)
 "Your Love Is Beautiful" (Reuben Morgan, Raymond Badham, Steve McPherson, Nigel Hendroff) - worship leader: Darlene Zschech - 4:38
 "God Is Great" (Marty Sampson) - worship leader: Marty Sampson, b. Darlene Zschech - 4:56
 "All of My Days" (Mark Stevens) - worship leader: Mark Stevens - 5:02
 "Emmanuel" (Badham) - worship leader: Darlene Zschech - 6:48
 "You Stand Alone" (Stevens, McPherson) - worship leaders: Steve McPherson, Mark Stevens - 4:48
 "Irresistible" (Darlene Zschech) - worship leader: Darlene Zschech - 6:05
 "You Are My World" (Sampson) - worship leader: Marty Sampson, b. Darlene Zschech - 6:31
 "Everything That Has Breath" (Morgan) - worship leader: Darlene Zschech - 4:22
 "God So Loved" (Morgan) - worship leader: Darlene Zschech - 5:54
 "To You" (Zschech) - worship leader: Darlene Zschech - 7:00
 "Worthy Is the Lamb" (Zschech) - worship leader: Miriam Webster - 7:16
 "Forever" (Sampson) - worship leader: Mark Stevens - 4:45
 "My Best Friend" (Joel Houston, Sampson) - worship leader: Marty Sampson, b. Darlene Zschech  - 5:19

Track listing (DVD)
The DVD has a slightly different track order and also contains three bonus songs, "Glorious" (found on the CD compilation album Extravagant Worship: The Songs of Darlene Zschech), and reprises of "You Are My World" and "God Is Great". The outro consists of a piano accompaniment version of "God Is Great".

 "Everything That Has Breath"
 "God Is Great"
 "All of My Days"
 "Emmanuel"
 "You Stand Alone"
 "Irresistible"
 "You Are My World"
 "Your Love Is Beautiful"
 "Glorious" (Darlene Zschech)
 "God So Loved"
 "To You"
 "Worthy Is the Lamb"
 "Forever"
 "My Best Friend"
 "You Are My World" (reprise)
 "God Is Great" (reprise)

Credits

 Darlene Zschech – worship pastor, producer, senior worship leader, senior lead vocal, vocal producer 
 Reuben Morgan – acoustic guitar, vocals, producer, worship leader, vocal producer
 Steve McPherson – vocals, vocal producer 
 Marty Sampson – acoustic guitar, vocals
 Miriam Webster – vocals 
 Paul Andrew – vocals 
 Tulele Faletolu – vocals 
 Donia Makedonez – vocals 
 Julie Bassett – vocals 
 Erica Crocker – vocals 
 Holly Dawson – vocals 
 Lucy Fisher – vocals 
 Michelle Fragar – vocals 
 Peter Hart – vocals 
 Mark Stevens – vocals 
 Scott Haslem – vocals 
 Ned Davies – vocals 
 Woody Pierson – vocals 
 Karen Horn – vocals
 Tanya Riches – vocals 
 Ruth Athanasio – choir conductor
 Russell Fragar – piano, music director, producer 
 Peter King – piano, keyboards, Hammond organ, programming, post 
 Craig Gower – keyboard
 Kevin Lee – keyboard
 David Moyse – electric guitar, post production engineer 
 Nigel Hendroff – acoustic guitar 
 Raymond Badham – electric guitar 
 Marcüs Beaumont – electric guitar, guitar technician, 
 Luke Munns – drums, percussion, cover art concept 
 Ross Peacock – drums
 Rick Petereit – drums 
 Peter Wallis – bass 
 Ian Fisher – bass 
 Adam Simek – percussion ensemble 
 Matthew Hope – trumpet 
 Gary Honor – saxophone 
 Steve Bullivant – saxophone 
 Jonno Louwrens – saxophone 
 Elisha Vella – percussion ensemble 
 Peter Kelly – percussion, tympani, percussion ensemble 
 Bobbie Houston – executive producer
 Chris Perry – artwork, design 
 George Gorga – house sound engineer
 Tim Tickner – assistant 
 Mark Hopkins – coordination 
 Matthew Barnes – assistant engineer 
 Don Bartley – mastering 
 Jeff Todd – post production engineer 
 David Watson – production coordination 
 Paul Pilsneniks – mixing assistant, assistant  
 Matt Barnes – assistant engineer  
 Tania Paurini – assistant production engineer 
 Femia Shirtliff – photography 
 Brett Randall – engineer 
 Martin Philbey – photography 
 Simone Ridley – project coordinator 
 Trevor Beck – engineer, production coordination, post production 
 Nick Asha – assistant 
 Iwan Sujono – artwork 
 Kevin Watts – assistant 
 Cassandra Langton – coordination 
 James Rudder – saxophone, engineer, post production engineer 
 Marty Beaton – technician 
 Brent Clark – mixing 
 Donna Crouch – coordination

References 

2001 live albums
2001 video albums
Live video albums
Hillsong Music live albums
Hillsong Music video albums